Gary Rippingale (10 July 1974 – 31 October 1992) was an English professional ice hockey defenceman who played for the Nottingham Panthers. He also played for the Great Britain national ice hockey team at Under-18 level.

Rippingale died on 31 October 1992, aged 18, from unknown causes following the team's Halloween party. His number 3 jersey was posthumously retired by the Panthers in his memory.

External links

1974 births
1992 deaths
English ice hockey defencemen
Nottingham Panthers players